Agnes George de Mille (September 18, 1905 – October 7, 1993) was an American dancer and choreographer.

Early years 
Agnes de Mille was born in New York City into a well-connected family of theater professionals. Her father William C. deMille and her uncle Cecil B. DeMille were both Hollywood directors. Her mother, Anna Angela George, was the daughter of Henry George, the economist. On her father's side, Agnes was the granddaughter of playwrights Henry Churchill de Mille and Matilda Beatrice deMille. Her paternal grandmother was of German-Jewish descent.

She had a love for acting and originally wanted to be an actress, but was told that she was "not pretty enough", so she turned her attention to dance. As a child, she had longed to dance, but dance at this time was considered more of an activity, rather than a viable career option, so her parents refused to allow her to dance. She did not seriously consider dancing as a career until after she graduated from college. When de Mille's younger sister was prescribed ballet classes to cure her flat feet, de Mille joined her. De Mille lacked flexibility and technique, though, and did not have a dancer's body. Classical ballet was the most widely known dance form at this time, and de Mille's apparent lack of ability limited her opportunities. She taught herself from watching film stars on the set with her father in Hollywood; these were more interesting for her to watch than perfectly turned out legs, and she developed strong character work and compelling performances. One of de Mille's early jobs, thanks to her father's connections, was choreographing Cecil B. DeMille's film Cleopatra (1934). DeMille's dance director LeRoy Prinz clashed with the younger de Mille. Her uncle always deferred to Prinz, even after agreeing to his niece's dances in advance, and Agnes de Mille left the film.

De Mille graduated from UCLA with a degree in English where she was a member of Kappa Alpha Theta sorority, and in 1933 moved to London to study with Dame Marie Rambert, eventually joining Rambert's company, The Ballet Club, later Ballet Rambert, and Antony Tudor's London Ballet.

Career 
De Mille arrived in New York in 1938 and later began her association with the fledgling American Ballet Theatre (then called the Ballet Theatre) in 1939. One of Agnes de Mille’s most overlooked but important pieces was Black Ritual or Obeah, which she began choreographing for the newly formed Ballet Theatre’s first season. Lasting 25 minutes, this performance was created for the “Negro Unit” of the dance company and was performed by 16 black female dancers. This was the first representation of black dancers in a New York ballet performance within the context of a dominantly white company. Therefore, although it was only performed three times before being disbanded, Black Ritual was an unprecedented performance and played a significant role in the history of the ballet industry of the country. While white people often had misconceptions about black dancers and the styles they would arbitrarily be best in, this performance forced them to contemplate and reevaluate these thoughts about how black people danced.

De Mille’s first actually recognized significant work was Rodeo (1942), whose score was by Aaron Copland, and which she staged for the Ballet Russe de Monte Carlo. Although de Mille continued to choreograph nearly up to the time of her death—her final ballet, The Other, was completed in 1992—most of her later works have dropped out of the ballet repertoire. Besides Rodeo, two other de Mille ballets are performed regularly, Three Virgins and a Devil (1934) adapted from a tale by Giovanni Boccaccio, and Fall River Legend (1948) based on the life of Lizzie Borden.

While she lived in New York and was working for the previously mentioned Ballet Theatre in 1941, de Mille choreographed Drums Sound in Hackensack for the Jooss Ballet (originally located in Germany), which had just moved to New York in 1939. This was an important step in the company’s history being that it was the first performance not choreographed by Kurt Jooss himself. Although there are no film recordings of the performance, de Mille’s choreography notes and personal reflections of the dancers shed light on the characteristics of the performance. The piece was placed in a historical context with an American theme and fit the traditional mold for de Mille’s pieces featuring a female perspective. Being one of the first pieces de Mille choreographed for a group of dancers rather than simply one or two people, the performance was significant in her career as a choreographer.

Later on, after her success with Rodeo, de Mille was hired to choreograph the musical Oklahoma! (1943). The dream ballet, in which dancers Marc Platt, Katherine Sergava, and George Church doubled for the leading actors, successfully integrated dance into the musical's plot. Instead of functioning as an interlude or divertissement, the ballet provided key insights into the heroine's emotional troubles. This performance is just one example of how de Mille brought new ideas to the performing arts industry. Through her production of Oklahoma!, she integrated dance into musical theater as a way of enhancing the original musical. This production is widely known for this innovative idea and is credited for starting de Mille’s fame as a choreographer, both for Broadway and in the dance industry. De Mille went on to choreograph over a dozen other musicals, most notably Bloomer Girl (1944), which presented her feelings of loneliness as a woman who saw her husband leave to serve for the army, Carousel (1945), Allegro (1947, Director as well as choreographer), Brigadoon (1947, for which she was co-recipient of the inaugural Tony Award for Best Choreography), Gentlemen Prefer Blondes (1949), Paint Your Wagon (1951), The Girl in Pink Tights (1954), Goldilocks (1957), and 110 in the Shade (1963). These many dance performances within the musical theater industry produced by Agnes de Mille enriched Broadway musicals in the way that they provided perspective on the events of the time period, including World War II.

De Mille's success on Broadway did not translate into success in film. Her only significant film credit is Oklahoma! (1955). She was not invited to recreate her choreography for either Brigadoon (1954) or Carousel (1956). Nevertheless, her two specials for the  Omnibus TV series titled "The Art of Ballet" and "The Art of Choreography" (both televised in 1956) were immediately recognized as landmark attempts to bring serious dance to the attention of a broad public.

During his presidency, John F. Kennedy appointed de Mille as a member of the National Advisory Committee on the Arts, the predecessor to the National Endowment for the Arts, of which she was appointed to by President L.B. Johnson after its activation.

Her love for acting played a very important role in her choreography. De Mille revolutionized musical theatre by creating choreography that not only conveyed the emotional dimensions of the characters but enhanced the plot. Her choreography, as a reflection of her awareness of acting, reflected the angst and turmoil of the characters instead of simply focusing on a dancer's physical technique.

De Mille regularly worked with a recognizable core group of dancers, including Virginia Bosler, Gemze de Lappe, Lidija Franklin, Jean Houloose, Dania Krupska, Bambi Linn, Joan McCracken, James Mitchell, Mavis Ray, and, at American Ballet Theatre, Sallie Wilson. Krupska, Mitchell, and Ray served as de Mille's assistant choreographers, and de Lappe took an active role in preserving de Mille's work.

In 1973, de Mille founded the Agnes de Mille Dance Theatre, which she later revived as Heritage Dance Theatre.

De Mille developed a love for public speaking, becoming an outspoken advocate for dance in America. She spoke in front of Congress three times: once in the Senate, once in the House of Representatives, and once for the Committee for Medical Research.

She was interviewed in the television documentary series Hollywood: A Celebration of the American Silent Film (1980) primarily discussing the work of her uncle Cecil B. DeMille.

Writings 
DeMille's 1951 memoir Dance to the Piper was translated into five languages. It was reissued in 2015 by New York Review Books.

De Mille was a lifelong friend of modern dance legend Martha Graham. De Mille, in 1992, published Martha: The Life and Work of Martha Graham, a biography of Graham that de Mille worked on for more than 30 years.

After suffering from a near-fatal stroke, she wrote five books: Reprieve (which outlined the experience), Who Was Henry George?, Where the Wings Grow, America Dances, Portrait Gallery, and Martha: The Life and Work of Martha Graham. She also wrote And Promenade Home, To a Young Dancer, The Book of Dance, Lizzie Borden: Dance of Death, Dance in America, Russian Journals, and Speak to Me, Dance with Me.

De Mille also wrote an introduction entitled "Anna George de Mille - A Note About the Author" to the book Henry George: Citizen of the World by Anna George de Mille (daughter of Henry George & Agnes' mother) which was published in 1950 by the University of North Carolina Press.

Personal life 
De Mille married Walter Prude on June 14, 1943. They had one child, Jonathan, born in 1946.

Agnes de Mille donated her papers to the Sophia Smith Collection at Smith College "between 1959 and 1968, and her Dance To The Piper was purchased in 1994. Three films were donated by Lester Tome in 2010. The bulk of the papers date from 1914 to 1960 and focus on both personal and professional aspects of de Mille's life."

She suffered a stroke on stage in 1975, but recovered. She died in 1993 of a second stroke in her Greenwich Village apartment.

Legacy 
De Mille was inducted into the American Theater Hall of Fame in 1973. De Mille's many other awards include the Tony Award for Best Choreography (1947, for Brigadoon), the Handel Medallion for achievement in the arts (1976), an honor from the Kennedy Center (1980), an Emmy for her work in The Indomitable de Mille (1980), Drama Desk Special Award (1986) and, in 1986, she was awarded the National Medal of Arts. De Mille also received seven honorary degrees from various colleges and universities. She was featured on a U.S. postage stamp in 2004.

At present, the only commercially available examples of de Mille's choreography are parts one and two of Rodeo by the American Ballet Theater, Fall River Legend (filmed in 1989 by the Dance Theatre of Harlem) and Oklahoma!

References 
Notes

Further reading
 
  Memoirs, anecdotes about famous performing artists.

External links 

 
 
 
 American Ballet Theatre bio. and list of works
 Kennedy Center bio.
 New York Public Library for the Performing Arts, Jerome Robbins Dance Division, 1905-Collection, (S) *MGZMD 37
 1936 Photos of Agnes de Mille for USPS commemorative stamp by Ned Scott
 Agnes de Mille papers at the Sophia Smith Collection, Smith College Special Collections
 Archival footage of Gemze de Lappe performing Agnes de Mille's Come to Me, Bend to Me in 2007 at Jacob's Pillow Dance Festival.

 Agnes de Mille photographs, 1860s-1980s, held by the Dance Division, New York Public Library for the Performing Arts.

1905 births
1993 deaths
American ballerinas
American people of German-Jewish descent
American women choreographers
American choreographers
Ballet choreographers
California State University, Long Beach alumni
Agnes
Donaldson Award winners
Artists from New York City
United States National Medal of Arts recipients
University of California, Los Angeles alumni
Kennedy Center honorees
Choreographers of American Ballet Theatre
Rambert Dance Company dancers
20th-century American ballet dancers
Tony Award winners